The 2016–17 Miami Hurricanes men's basketball team represented the University of Miami during the 2016–17 NCAA Division I men's basketball season. The Hurricanes were members of the Atlantic Coast Conference (ACC). They were led by sixth-year head coach Jim Larrañaga and played their home games at the Watsco Center on the university's campus in Coral Gables, Florida. They finished the season 21–12, 10–8 in ACC play to finish in a three-way tie for seventh place. They defeated Syracuse in the second round of the ACC tournament to advance to the quarterfinals where they lost to North Carolina. They received an at-large bid to the NCAA tournament as the No. 8 seed in the Midwest region. There they lost in the first round to Michigan State.

Previous season
The Hurricanes finished the 2015–16 season 27–8, 13–5 in ACC play to finish in a tie for second place. They defeated Virginia Tech in the quarterfinals of the ACC tournament before losing to Virginia. They received an at-large bid to the NCAA tournament where they defeated Buffalo and Wichita State to advance to the Sweet Sixteen. There they lost to eventual national champion Villanova.

Offseason

Departures

Incoming transfers

2016 recruiting class

Roster

Schedule and results

|-
!colspan=12 style=| Exhibition

|-
!colspan=12 style=| Non-conference Regular Season

|-
!colspan=12 style=| ACC Regular Season

|-
!colspan=12 style=| ACC tournament

|-
!colspan=12 style=| NCAA tournament

Rankings

*AP does not release post-NCAA tournament rankings

References

Miami Hurricanes men's basketball seasons
Miami
Miami Hurricanes men's basketball team
Miami Hurricanes men's basketball team
Miami